is an andesitic volcano in the Mount Raiden Volcanic Group on the border between Iwanai and Rankoshi, Hokkaidō, Japan. Mount Raiden is a pyroclastic cone. The mountain consists of primarily non-alkali, mafic, volcanic rock.

References

 Geographical Survey Institute

Volcanoes of Hokkaido
Mountains of Hokkaido